The Hasso Plattner Institute of Design at Stanford, commonly known as the d.school, is a design thinking institute based at Stanford University. David M. Kelley and Bernard Roth founded the program. According to the New York Times, the d.school has become one of the most highly sought academic programs at Stanford.

History

The Institute was founded by Stanford mechanical engineering professor David M. Kelley, six other professors, and George Kembel in 2004.  The program integrates business, law, medicine, social sciences and humanities into more traditional engineering and product design education.

The institute got its current name from Hasso Plattner, co-founder of SAP SE software, who contributed $35 million towards its founding. The institute cooperates closely with the Hasso Plattner Institute in Potsdam, Germany.

Products
Among the products launched from the Institute are the Embrace blanket, a low-cost alternative to neonatal incubators and the d.light, a solar-powered LED light now in use in some rural communities in the developing world.  The Pulse News Reader was developed in a d.school class in 2010, and became the highest-selling application at Apple's App Store.

See also
Stanford University
Stanford Center for Design Research
Stanford Joint Program in Design

References

External links

Stanford University
Design schools in the United States